Tim Moore may refer to:

Politicians
 Tim Moore (North Carolina politician) (born 1970), American politician from North Carolina
 Tim Moore (Michigan politician) (born 1967), State House Representative for the 97th District of Michigan
 Tim Moore (Australian politician) (born 1948), New South Wales politician
 Tim Moore (Kentucky politician) (born 1966), House of Representative member from Kentucky

Others
 Tim Moore (comedian) (1887–1958), American actor, vaudeville and television comedian
 Tim Moore (writer) (born 1964), British travel writer and humorist
 Tim Moore (singer-songwriter), American songwriter who released five solo albums on Elektra Records
 Tim Moore (diver) (born 1953), American diver

See also
 Tim (disambiguation)
 Moore (surname)